Andy MacLeod (born 14 March 1969 in Glasgow) is a retired Scottish professional footballer. Since retirement from the professional game he played semi professional football at Highland league clubs, (Ross County F.C. Brora Rangers F.C. Wick Academy F.C. Foress Mechanics F.C).  He Managed Brora Rangers F.C. at Highland league level.  Following retirement from football he became a senior manager within the Highland Council.

References

1969 births
Living people
Footballers from Glasgow
Scottish footballers
Scottish expatriate footballers
Expatriate footballers in the Netherlands
Aberdeen F.C. players
Fortuna Sittard players
Ross County F.C. players
Scottish Football League players
Brora Rangers F.C. players
Association football forwards
Highland Football League players
Eredivisie players
Scottish expatriate sportspeople in the Netherlands